DeJon 'Deeky' Jarmond Jarreau (born January 23, 1998) is an American professional basketball player for the Capital City Go-Go of the NBA G League. He played college basketball for the UMass Minutemen and the Houston Cougars.

Early life and high school career
Jarreau grew up in the 7th Ward of New Orleans, a neighborhood suffering from crime and poverty. He attended McDonogh 35 College Preparatory Charter High School in New Orleans. He competed for Elfrid Payton Elite on the Amateur Athletic Union circuit. Jarreau was a four-star recruit and committed to playing college basketball for UMass over an offer from Miami (Florida).

College career

UMass
On November 14, 2016, Jarreau recorded a freshman season-high 25 points, eight rebounds and six assists in a 90–88 loss to Ole Miss. He averaged 9.8 points and 4.5 assists per game. Jarreau left UMass after head coach Derek Kellogg was fired.

Houston
For his sophomore season, Jarreau transferred to Houston. As a sophomore, he averaged 8.7 points, 3.8 rebounds and 3.3 assists per game and was named American Athletic Conference (AAC) Sixth Man of the Year. On February 1, 2020, he was ejected from a game against Cincinnati for biting the leg of an opposing player and received a one-game suspension. In his junior season, Jarreau averaged nine points, 4.3 rebounds and 3.7 assists per game. He declared for the 2020 NBA draft before withdrawing his name and returning to college. On March 12, 2021, Jarreau recorded 15 points, 10 rebounds and 10 assists in a 77–52 win over Tulane at the AAC tournament quarterfinals. It was the first triple-double by a Houston player since Bo Outlaw in 1993 and the first in AAC Tournament history. As a senior, Jarreau averaged 10.6 points, 5.4 rebounds, 4.3 assists and 1.3 steals per game. He was named AAC Defensive Player of the Year as well as Second Team All-AAC.

Professional career

Indiana Pacers (2021)
After going undrafted in the 2021 NBA draft, he joined the Miami Heat for the 2021 NBA Summer League. Following a strong Summer League performance, he was signed to a two-way contract by the Indiana Pacers on August 24, 2021. Under the terms of the deal, he split time between the Pacers and their NBA G League affiliate, the Fort Wayne Mad Ants. On December 15, he was waived after making one appearance with the Pacers.

Texas Legends (2022)
On December 27, 2021, Jarreau was traded by the Fort Wayne Mad Ants to the Texas Legends in exchange for Kenny Williams and a 2022 first-round draft pick.

On December 28, 2021, Jarreau signed a 10-day contract with the Houston Rockets, via the hardship exemption. On December 30, however, he entered the NBA's health and safety protocols and never played a game for the Rockets. After his contract with the Rockets expired, Jarreau joined the Legends.

Capital City Go-Go (2022–present)
On January 23, 2022, Jarreau and a 2022 second-round draft pick were traded to the Capital City Go-Go in exchange for two 2022 first-round draft picks. On March 7, he was waived. On February 24, 2023, Jarreau was reacquired by the Capital City Go-Go.

Career statistics

NBA

|-
| style="text-align:left;"| 2021–22
| style="text-align:left;"| Indiana
| 1 || 0 || 1.0 || – || – || – || .0 || .0 || .0 || .0 || .0
|- class="sortbottom"
| style="text-align:center;" colspan="2"| Career
| 1 || 0 || 1.0 || – || – || – || .0 || .0 || .0 || .0 || .0

College

|-
| style="text-align:left;"| 2016–17
| style="text-align:left;"| UMass
| 31 || 24 || 24.4 || .442 || .244 || .644 || 3.6 || 4.5 || 1.0 || .7 || 9.8
|-
| style="text-align:left;"| 2018–19
| style="text-align:left;"| Houston
| 30 || 0 || 18.0 || .471 || .364 || .694 || 3.8 || 3.3 || .6 || .5 || 8.7
|-
| style="text-align:left;"| 2019–20
| style="text-align:left;"| Houston
| 30 || 17 || 23.1 || .374 || .175 || .795 || 4.3 || 3.7 || .6 || .4 || 9.0
|-
| style="text-align:left;"| 2020–21
| style="text-align:left;"| Houston
| 31 || 31 || 28.3 || .432 || .344 || .703 || 5.4 || 4.3 || 1.3 || .5 || 10.6
|- class="sortbottom"
| style="text-align:center;" colspan="2"| Career
| 122 || 72 || 23.5 || .429 || .285 || .713 || 4.3 || 4.0 || .9 || .5 || 9.5

Personal life
Dejon has a brother named John Jarreau. He is also the cousin of rapper Young Greatness, who was shot and killed in 2018. Jarreau has been a basketball teammate of his close friend Brison Gresham in high school and college. He is the first member of his family to graduate from college.

References

External links
Houston Cougars bio
UMass Minutemen bio

1998 births
Living people
American men's basketball players
Basketball players from New Orleans
Capital City Go-Go players
Fort Wayne Mad Ants players
Houston Cougars men's basketball players
Indiana Pacers players
Point guards
Shooting guards
Texas Legends players
UMass Minutemen basketball players
Undrafted National Basketball Association players